Victoria Azarenka and Ashleigh Barty are the defending champions but neither player chose to participate.

Hsieh Su-wei and Barbora Strýcová won the title, defeating Anna-Lena Friedsam and Raluca Olaru in the final, 6–2, 6–2.

Seeds
The top four seeds received a bye into the second round.

Draw

Finals

Top half

Bottom half

References

External links
Main Draw

Women's Doubles